Puerto Rico Highway 152 (PR-152) is a rural road that travels from Barranquitas to Naranjito in Puerto Rico. This road extends from PR-156 in downtown Barranquitas and ends at its junction with PR-5 and PR-164 near downtown Naranjito.

Route description

Gastronomic route
From June 2019, PR-152 is the Gastronomic route of Naranjito, for having a large variety of restaurants and businesses along its route for - a term that loosely translates to "bar hopping".  is when people go from place to place along a route, stopping in for a bite to eat or a drink and these "gastronomic routes" have been established around the island of Puerto Rico to stimulate local tourism.

Major intersections

Related route

Puerto Rico Highway 152R (abbreviated Ramal PR-152 or PR-152R) is a bypass road that branches off from PR-152 and ends at PR-143 in Helechal. It is officially designated as Avenida Ingeniero José Zayas Green.

See also

 List of highways numbered 152

References

External links

 Abierta la Ruta del Chinchorreo por la PR-152 

152